Google voice search may refer to:

Google Voice Search, a product that allows speech input to Google Search
Google Voice Local Search, a Google telephone service, 2007–2010

See also
 Google Voice, a telephony service that provides call-forwarding, voicemail, and messaging